Arthur Martinus Hartmann (né Arthur Hartman; July 23, 1881 – March 30, 1956) was an American violinist, composer and friend of Claude Debussy.

Hartmann was the son of Sigmund Hartman and Pepi Schweiger, who had immigrated from Hungary in December 1879. His father discovered his musical talents early on, and from the age of 6 Arthur studied with the Dutch-born violinist and composer  (1854–1941). Later, Hartmann would adopt "Martinus" as a middle name in his teacher's honor.

Uncle to writer/artist Alfred Bendiner (1899–1964)

Author of "Claude Debussy as I Knew Him' and Other Writings of Arthur Hartmann"

Biography

Compositions

Awards and recognitions

References

Sources
The Arthur Hartmann Project: Thumbnail Biography

External links 
The Violin Site

 Archival records at University of Toronto Music Library

1881 births
1956 deaths
American male violinists
American male composers
American people of Hungarian-Jewish descent
20th-century American violinists
20th-century American male musicians